is a JR West Geibi Line station located in Kamikōjiro, Tessei-chō, Niimi, Okayama Prefecture, Japan.

History
The Ichioka Station was opened on October 1, 1953.

Station layout
The Ichioka Station is a ground-level one platform station. The Ichioka Post Office is located near the station.

Connecting lines
All lines are JR West lines.
Geibi Line
Local: Sakane Station — Ichioka Station — Yagami Station

External links
 JR West

Geibi Line
Railway stations in Okayama Prefecture
Railway stations in Japan opened in 1953